Khalil Tate (born October 23, 1998) is an American gridiron football quarterback who is currently a free agent. He was most recently a member of the Toronto Argonauts of the Canadian Football League (CFL). After playing quarterback at the University of Arizona, he signed with the Philadelphia Eagles as an undrafted free agent in 2020. Tate has also been a member of the Edmonton Elks.

Early years
Tate attended Junípero Serra High School in Gardena, California. As a senior, he had over 2,000 passing and 2,000 rushing yards and accounted for 43 touchdowns. Tate was a consensus 4-star recruit and named a top-ten dual threat quarterback by ESPN. On March 16, 2015, Tate committed to play college football for the University of Arizona.

College career

In 2016, at only 17 years old, Tate started his college career as a true freshman at Arizona. He became the first true freshman to start a game at Arizona since Willie Tuitama in 2005. Tate played in seven games and made one start. In his debut against UCLA, Tate completed five of nine passes for 72 yards and two touchdowns and rushed for 79 yards on 15 carries. Two weeks later he made his first career start against USC and completed seven of 18 passes for 58 yards with an interception and added 72 rushing yards and a touchdown. For the season, Tate completed 18 of 45 passes for 243 yards, three touchdowns, three interceptions and rushed for 237 yards over 49 carries with one touchdown.

Tate entered his sophomore season in 2017 as the backup to Brandon Dawkins. When Dawkins went down with an injury early against Colorado Tate relieved him for the remainder of the game. During the game, he rushed for an FBS quarterback-record 327 yards, breaking the previous record of 321 held by Jordan Lynch. Following his performance, Tate was awarded the Pac-12 Offensive player of the week and would be named starting quarterback. He would follow up his opening performance with wins over UCLA, Cal, and Washington St. eventually being named Pac-12 Offensive player of the week for four consecutive weeks – setting a conference record.

Tate entered his senior season as the full-time starter for the Wildcats. They made their season debut against Hawaii, narrowly losing 38–45. Tate completed 22 of 39 attempts for 361 yards, 2 touchdowns, and 3 interceptions.

Statistics

Awards and honors
 AP Pac-12 Newcomer Player of the Year (2017)
 4× Pac-12 Offensive Player of the Week (2017)
 All-Pac-12 Academic Honorable Mention (2017)
 All-Pac-12 Honorable Mention (2017)

Professional career

Philadelphia Eagles 
On April 26, 2020, the Philadelphia Eagles signed Tate as an undrafted free agent with the intention of converting him to wide receiver. He was waived on July 20, 2020. On January 13, 2021, Tate signed a reserve/futures contract with the Eagles. He was waived on June 9, 2021.

Edmonton Elks 
On January 18, 2022, Tate signed with the Edmonton Elks of the Canadian Football League (CFL). He was released at the start of training camp on May 15, 2022.

Toronto Argonauts 
On July 27, 2022, Tate signed with the Toronto Argonauts of the Canadian Football League. Tate was released by the Argos on August 9, 2022. He did not make an appearance for the Argonauts during the 2022 season.

References

External links
 Toronto Argonauts bio
 Arizona Wildcats bio

1998 births
Living people
American football quarterbacks
American football wide receivers
Arizona Wildcats football players
Edmonton Elks players
Philadelphia Eagles players
Players of American football from Inglewood, California
Junípero Serra High School (Gardena, California) alumni
Toronto Argonauts players